The following is a list of Austrian women's soccer teams:

First division

Second Division

Other Divisions
The 3rd, 4th and 5th divisions are organized by the local football associations from the various federal states.

Gallery

External links
Austrian women's teams at uefa.com

 
women's
Women's sport-related lists